Karl Joseph Schneider (15 August 1905 – 25 September 1928) was a cricketer who played for Victoria and South Australia.

Cricket career
Only 157 cm tall, Schneider was born in the Melbourne suburb of Hawthorn and was a left-handed batsman who occasionally bowled right-arm wrist spin. Schneider showed precocious talent as a schoolboy player and was selected for his first-class debut as a 17-year-old while attending Xavier College, Melbourne. Batting at number eight, he contributed 55 runs to Victoria's (then) world record total of 1059, against Tasmania. Despite this promising start, Schneider had to wait two years for another opportunity and he eventually relocated to Adelaide in 1926 when it became obvious that he was not going to get a regular place in the strong Victorian batting line-up. Schneider was also a noted footballer and he joined the Norwood Football Club on his move to Adelaide.

In 1926–27, his first season with South Australia, Schneider hit 605 runs at an average of 50.41 to help the team win the Sheffield Shield. He then scored another 520 runs (at 52.00) the following season to earn selection for the Australian second team that toured New Zealand in the autumn of 1928. He had a successful tour (averaging 46.85) and appeared likely to break into the Test team in the coming years. However, he collapsed while horse riding during the latter stages of the New Zealand tour, the first signs of the illness that took his life later in the year. He died of leukaemia, before the next cricket season commenced, at Kensington Park, South Australia, only three weeks after his 23rd birthday.

Schneider played 20 first-class matches, scoring 1509 runs (at 48.67) and taking 10 wickets (at 35.50). He made six centuries, the highest of which was 146 for South Australia against New South Wales at the Sydney Cricket Ground in January 1927. For the Australian touring team against Canterbury in March 1928 he made 138, and he and Bert Oldfield added 229 for the seventh wicket in a little under two hours.

Schneider holds the runs record for the Xavier College First XI. During his four seasons in the firsts (1921, 1922, 1923, 1924) he made 1642 runs including seven centuries. He captained the team in 1922, 1923 and 1924 and won premierships in 1923 and 1924. Schneider also holds the wickets record for the Xavier First XI, having taken 139 wickets.

See also
 List of Victoria first-class cricketers

References
Cashman, Richard et al. — editors (1996): The Oxford Companion to Australian Cricket, OUP. .

Notes

External links
 
 The Age: Little man who gave the Don big boots to fill.

1905 births
1928 deaths
Australian cricketers
Victoria cricketers
South Australia cricketers
Deaths from leukemia
Melbourne Cricket Club cricketers
People educated at Xavier College
Norwood Football Club players
Australian rules footballers from Melbourne
Cricketers from Melbourne
Deaths from cancer in South Australia
People from Hawthorn, Victoria